Ruta Leonesa Fútbol Sala was a futsal club based in León, city of the province of León in the autonomous community of Castile and León.

The club was founded in 1983 and her stadium is Estadio Palacio de los Deportes with capacity of 7,000 seaters.

Their main sponsor were Obras y Estructuras RAM.

In August 2010, the club was dissolved due to the economic limitations.

References

External links
Official Website

Sport in León, Spain
Futsal clubs in Castile and León
Futsal clubs established in 1983
Sports clubs disestablished in 2010
1983 establishments in Spain
2010 disestablishments in Spain